was a town located in Ōchi District, Shimane Prefecture, Japan.

As of 2003, the town had an estimated population of 6,337 and a density of 46.13 persons per km2. The total area was 137.36 km2.

On October 1, 2004, Iwami, along with the town of Mizuho, and the village of Hasumi (all from Ōchi District), was merged to create the town of Ōnan.

History
An Imperial decree in July 1899 established Iwami as an open port for trading with the United States and the United Kingdom.

The name Iwami also refers to a region of Shimane Prefecture which makes up the South/West half of the prefecture.

Iwami Airport in Masuda is a 2 or 3 hour drive from Ōnan.

References

Dissolved municipalities of Shimane Prefecture